Yoskar Galván-Mercado is an American professional soccer player who plays as a midfielder for Union Omaha.

Early life
Galván-Mercado was born in Lexington, Nebraska. Both of his parents are from Guatemala, where his father used to play and coach. Galván-Mercado would eventually play for Lexington High School's boys soccer team, who finished runners-up in the 2021 Nebraska Class B state championship during his senior year.

Career
Galván-Mercado signed an academy contract with Union Omaha of USL League One in the summer of 2021, also making two appearances for the first-team during the 2021 season. He had previously participated in a USL Academy tournament for the team in the fall of 2019, before the start of the club's first season. In 2022, he signed with Union Omaha on a full professional contract.

Career statistics

Club

References

American soccer players
Union Omaha players
2003 births
People from Lexington, Nebraska
Living people
Soccer players from Nebraska
USL League One players
American people of Guatemalan descent